Gunnersbury Cemetery, also known as Kensington or New Kensington Cemetery, is a cemetery opened in 1929. Although it is owned and managed by the Royal Borough of Kensington and Chelsea, it is geographically located within the London Borough of Hounslow, at 143 Gunnersbury Avenue in Acton.

History
A triangle of land between the Gunnersbury Avenue and the Great West Road, part of the Gunnersbury Park, was bought in 1925 from the Rothschild family by the Royal Borough. The cemetery was founded soon afterwards, in 1929, on the former parkland.

Location and facilities
The cemetery is situated adjacent to Gunnersbury Park and covers about 8.9 hectares. It has numerous floral displays and shrubberies, and a chapel. The cemetery's buildings, including the chapel, are simple brick structures. A Garden of Remembrance serves as the place for the interment of cremated remains. There is also a Book of Remembrance for memorial inscriptions. Gunnersbury Cemetery is the location of the main office for both the Borough's cemeteries (the other being the Royal Borough of Kensington and Chelsea Cemetery, Hanwell).

A notable landmark at the cemetery is a monument, in the form of a black obelisk, dedicated to the Polish victims of the Katyn massacre. It was designed by Louis Fitzgibbon and Count Stefan Zamoyski. This monument was unveiled on 18 September 1976 amid considerable controversy. During the period of the Cold War, successive British governments objected to plans by the UK's Polish community to build a major monument to commemorate the massacre. The Soviet Union did not want Katyn to be remembered, and put pressure on Britain to prevent the creation of the monument. As a result, the construction of the Katyn monument was delayed for many years. After the local community had finally secured the right to build the monument, no official government representative was present at the opening ceremony (although some members of parliament did attend the event unofficially).

Gunnersbury cemetery also contains the graves of 49 Commonwealth service personnel of World War II.

There was a notable sculpture by Nereo Cescott in the cemetery, but it was destroyed by vandals prior to 1994.

Opening hours

Burials
Notable interments include:
 A plot dedicated to the 24th Polish Lancers Regiment and their families
 Luranah Aldridge, English opera singer.
 Denzil Batchelor, British journalist, writer, playwright and broadcaster.
 Tadeusz Bór-Komorowski, Polish general, during World War II, commander of the Warsaw uprising and Polish Commander-in-Chief. Reburied in Powazki Military Cemetery, Warsaw, in 1994.
 Hugh Burden, British actor and playwright
 William Davison, 1st Baron Broughshane
 Charles Benjamin Dowse, 8th Bishop of Killaloe
 Matila Costiesco Ghyka, Romanian prince, novelist, mathematician, historian, philosopher and diplomat
 George Humphreys, British civil engineer
 Robin Hyde, New Zealand poet, novelist and journalist
 Harold Brownlow Martin, Australian pilot on the Dambuster raid
 Charles Langbridge Morgan, British playwright and novelist
 John Ogdon, English pianist and composer
 Vera Page, victim of an unresolved murder
 Carol Reed, English film director
 Prince Vsevolod Ivanovich of Russia
 Kazimierz Sabbat, Prime Minister and President of Poland in Exile
 
 Dr Hans Henrik Bruun, engineer, barrister
 Matthew Smith, English painter
 Marda Vanne, South African actress
 Aston Webb, English architect
 Saeed Jaffrey, British-Indian Actor, OBE (1995), Padma Shri (2016, posthumously)

References

External links
 Official entry on the Royal Borough's Libraries
 A map of the cemetery

1929 establishments in England
Cemeteries in London
Parks and open spaces in the Royal Borough of Kensington and Chelsea